Mesnier is a French surname. Notable people with the surname include:

 Louis Mesnier (1884–1921), French footballer
 Paul Mesnier (1904–1988), French film director
 Roland Mesnier (1944–2022), French-American pastry chef and culinary writer
 Thomas Mesnier (born 1986), French physician and politician

See also
 Raoul Mesnier du Ponsard

French-language surnames